Pizza pugliese is a style of pizza in Italian cuisine prepared with tomato, onion, and mozzarella. It is named after the region of Apulia (called in Italian Puglia). It should not be confused with pizza barese, the local Barese variant of preparing the pizza dough, which tends to be thinner and crispier than pizza napoletana.

Variations
Variations exist, in which different cheeses and ingredients may be added. Some versions may also use oregano, olives and capers as ingredients, and some may omit the use of pizza sauce and substitute half of the mozzarella with Provolone cheese that is sliced or grated. Some versions may use pecorino cheese.

See also
 List of pizza varieties by country
 List of tomato dishes

References

pugliese
Tomato dishes